is a fictional monster, or kaiju, which first appeared in Godzilla Raids Again (1955), the second film in the Godzilla franchise. Anguirus is the first monster to be shown engaging in combat with Godzilla in a film. Since then, the character has appeared conversely as an enemy and an ally of Godzilla in numerous films produced by Toho, including Destroy All Monsters, Godzilla vs. Gigan, Godzilla vs. Megalon, Godzilla vs. Mechagodzilla, and Godzilla: Final Wars. He has also appeared in other media, including comic books and video games.

Overview

Appearance
Anguirus is a quadrupedal giant or irradiated dinosaur that resembles an ankylosaurus. His head resembles a cross between that of a ceratosaurus and a styracosaurus. He has several horns on the top of his head and a single horn above his nose. His face is long and drawn out, has rows of long, serrated teeth and has two tusks on his lower jaw. His carapace is studded with long, sharp spikes. Anguirus' tail is covered with spikes (he also had a tail club in Godzilla: Final Wars). His tail makes up most of his body length. His hind limbs are longer than his forelimbs, and he can stand up on them to his full height, though he generally walks upon all fours. Anguirus has not one but five brains, one in his head which controls all of his organs, and one above each one of his limbs; each brain most likely controls the limb it  is above. This gives Anguirus an advantage in battle, for he can react much quicker than most kaiju. Anguirus first appears in the Showa continuity as brown with yellowish spines, these colors are later changed in the Millennium series to light gray, with orange spikes and horns.

Powers and abilities

In his first appearance in Godzilla Raids Again, it is explained that Anguirus is capable of moving incredibly fast in spite of his bulk due to his brain extending into his chest and abdominal areas, allowing him to react more quickly. He is able to lunge at his opponents with massive leaps, as seen in Godzilla vs. Mechagodzilla, and is also capable of burrowing substantial distances.  His long, burrowing journey started in Godzilla vs. Megalon and ended in Godzilla vs. Mechagodzilla, in which he resurfaces underneath Mechagodzilla and battles until his jaw is broken by the robot. Two of his attacks involve jumping backward to impale his opponents on his spiked carapace in Godzilla vs. Gigan and his vice-like bite; the most famous example of the latter being when he faced King Ghidorah in Destroy All Monsters and latched onto one of King Ghidorah's necks, his grip holding firm even after the space monster took flight. Anguirus also has the ability to heal and regenerate in a few minutes, as executives said he recovered almost immediately after Mechagodzilla broke his jaw. Anguirus has incredible durability, surviving being stomped on, being kicked with immense robotic force, being dropped from high altitudes, and surviving Godzilla's atomic ray.

In Godzilla: Final Wars, Anguirus was redesigned with the ability to curl himself into a ball and propel himself forward with tremendous speed. The Final Wars version also possessed a spiked tail club like a real ankylosaurus, though it was not used in combat. He also had leg spikes.

Within Godzilla Raids Again, Anguirus' last roars, before being defeated by Godzilla, caused ultrasonic-like effect which produced cracks on Osaka Castle. Anguirus was also noted to be able to emit stunning poison from his claws and back spikes. Anguirus was also originally planned to breath an atomic ray in Godzilla Raids Again, and this was recorded in the official novelization of the film.

Behind the scenes

During the existence of the character, there have been three official Anguirus suits. The first and second were constructed under the supervision of Eiji Tsuburaya. After the release of Godzilla Raids Again, Toho was looking to release the movie to Western audiences but was having trouble finding a distributor. AB-PT pictures, an American distribution company, was producing their own movie The Volcano Monsters shortly after the release of Godzilla Raids Again. AB-PT attempted to incorporate the monster footage of Toho's film into their own, but had little success. They struck up a deal between the two companies; the second Godzilla suit and the original Anguirus suit were shipped to Los Angeles to film some additional scenes. Due to financial problems with AB-PT studios, the company collapsed and its assets were absorbed into other production companies. The second Godzilla suit and the original Anguirus suit both disappeared and remain lost to this day. The second suit, created for color filming, was built in 1968. The design had no radical changes from the original aside from some modification on the thickness of the spines and arrangement of the teeth. For Godzilla: Final Wars, a third suit was built incorporating modern sculpting methods and animatronics. The final suit is darker in color and somewhat more streamlined and biologically realistic in design. Angurius' roars were created by using the sounds of a saxophone, a harmonica, an oboe, and a tuba.

Anguirus has been played by multiple actors throughout the Godzilla movie series:
 Godzilla Raids Again (first version) – Katsumi Tezuka
 Destroy All Monsters (second version) – Hiroshi Sekita
 Godzilla vs. Gigan (second version) – Yukietsu Omiya
 Godzilla vs. Megalon (second version) – Yukietsu Omiya
 Godzilla vs. Mechagodzilla (second version) – Kin-ichi Kusumi
 Godzilla: Final Wars (third version) – Toshihiro Ogura

Film history

Shōwa period (1955–1974)

According to the English subtitles of the 1955 Japanese language film Godzilla Raids Again, Anguirus, or "Angilas" as he was referred to in the film, was properly called an Angilosaurus, a fictional dinosaur described as "one of the stronger dinosaurs that lived in the prehistoric era." Additionally, it is described in a textbook by Polish world animal specialist Plateli Hondon as "one of the few creatures that had a thorough hatred for war-like predators," which explains Anguirus' eagerness to fight Godzilla. Angilosaurus lived from 150-70 million years ago, and was awakened by the same hydrogen bombs that awoke Godzilla. In the English-dubbed version of Godzilla Raids Again - released as Gigantis the Fire Monster in the US - the name of the dinosaur is pronounced ""ANG-will-o-Saw-rus," and given the sub-moniker "Killer of the Living". According to the film, they ruled the Earth at one time, then disappeared suddenly. From an unnamed textbook in the movie, a scientist reads that the angilosaurs may return from hibernation due to radioactive fallout. Anguirus is said to have "brains in several parts of its body, including the head, abdomen, and the chest".

Anguirus was the first enemy that Godzilla ever faced. The two monsters battle in Osaka, and after a fierce struggle, Godzilla defeats Anguirus with a bite to the neck before incinerating the latter's body with its atomic breath.

Anguirus was reintroduced in the 1968 film Destroy All Monsters, as an ally and best friend of Godzilla living with him on Monsterland. Anguirus also helps Godzilla repel the space monsters, Gigan and King Ghidorah in the 1972 film Godzilla vs. Gigan. In 1973's Godzilla vs. Megalon, Anguirus and Godzilla live on Monster Island until nuclear bomb tests destroy the island and cause Anguirus to fall into a fissure.

As of the film Godzilla vs. Mechagodzilla, Anguirus tunneled his way to Japan and encounters Mechagodzilla disguised as the real Godzilla. Realizing it was an imposter, Anguirus fights Mechagodzilla, but had its jaw broken in a bloody display and forced to retreat underground. Despite this, Anguirus tore off a piece of Mechagodzilla's disguise and alerts Godzilla to the imposter's presence. Anguirus is understood to have recovered from his injuries due to the fact that Destroy All Monsters chronologically takes place after these events.

The Showa Anguirus was 60 meters (197 feet) tall, 100 meters (328 feet) long and weighed 30,000 metric tons.

Millennium period (2004)
Anguirus was intended to appear in the unmade film Godzilla X Varan, Baragon, and Anguirus: Giant Monsters All-Out Attack, set to be directed by Shusuke Kaneko and released in 2001. However, Toho requested that Kaneko replace Anguirus and Varan with the more popular Mothra and King Ghidorah, respectively, leading to the release of the film Godzilla, Mothra and King Ghidorah: Giant Monsters All-Out Attack.

Anguirus returned in the 2004 film, Godzilla: Final Wars, as a brainwashed pawn of the alien Xiliens. The aliens secretly dispatch Anguirus to attack Shanghai, where he battles the flying United Nations battleship, Karyu until the Xiliens teleport Anguirus away to make humanity believe they had destroyed the monster. Once humanity discovers the Xiliens' true objective, the latter send fighters and Anguirus to destroy the Karyu. Following this, Anguirus, Rodan, and King Caesar are dispatched to confront Godzilla, but are ultimately defeated.

The Millennium Anguirus was 90 meters (295 feet) tall, 160 meters (525 feet) long and weighed 60,000 metric tons.

Reiwa period (2017-2021) 
In the prologue for the film Godzilla: Planet of the Monsters, the corpses of Anguirus and Rodan make a cameo, having been killed by the Chinese military bio-weapon.

This is expanded upon in the prequel novel Godzilla: Monster Apocalypse, in which Anguirus and Rodan attacked Beijing before they were killed by a bio-weapon called Hedorah. Additionally, two other members of Anguirus' species appear, with one attacking South Africa and the other killed by Godzilla in Los Angeles.

In the Godzilla Singular Point anime series, Anguirus scavenges several Rodan carcasses from a JSDF base in Chiba Prefecture's forests and causes trouble for the locals, with the local mayor's son coining the monster's name for his resemblance to ankylosaurs. After Anguirus hinders military responses with its ability to predict attacks and deflect projectiles by vibrating its spines, the JSDF, local hunters, and the Otaki Factory's mecha Jet Jaguar join forces to lure out Anguirus. It's discovered the creature can use quantum mechanics due to its extra-dimensional composition to predict the future. They stun it with a harpoon gun and presume it dead before it attacks the mayor's photoshoot, leading to Jet Jaguar killing Anguirus with a point-blank harpoon shot. The mecha's inventor later takes one of Anguirus' horns as a trophy and to fashion into a spear for Jet Jaguar.

MonsterVerse (2019) 
Skeletal remains resembling Anguirus appears briefly in the film Godzilla: King of the Monsters within the ancient sunken city that houses Godzilla's lair.

Appearances

Films
 Godzilla Raids Again (1955)
 Destroy All Monsters (1968)
 All Monsters Attack (1969, stock footage cameo)
 Godzilla vs. Gigan (1972)
 Godzilla vs. Megalon (1973)
 Godzilla vs. Mechagodzilla (1974)
 Godzilla: Final Wars (2004)
 Godzilla: Planet of the Monsters (2017, skeleton corpse)
  Godzilla: King of the Monsters (2019, Skeleton corpse)

Television
 Godzilla Island (1997–1998)
 Godzilla Singular Point (2021)

Video games
 Godzilla / Godzilla-Kun: Kaijuu Daikessen (Game Boy – 1990)
 Battle Soccer: Field no Hasha (SNES – 1992)
 Kaijū-ō Godzilla / King of the Monsters, Godzilla (Game Boy – 1993)
 Godzilla: Battle Legends (Turbo Duo – 1993)
 Godzilla: Monster War / Godzilla: Destroy All Monsters (Super Famicom – 1994)
 Godzilla Giant Monster March (Game Gear – 1995)
 Godzilla Trading Battle (PlayStation – 1998)
 Godzilla: Destroy All Monsters Melee (GCN, Xbox – 2002/2003)
 Godzilla: Domination! (GBA – 2002)
 Godzilla: Save the Earth (Xbox, PS2 – 2004)
 Godzilla: Unleashed (Wii, PS2 – 2007)
 Godzilla Unleashed: Double Smash (NDS – 2007)
 Godzilla (PS3, PS4 – 2014)
 Godzilla Defense Force (2019)
 Magic: The Gathering Arena - Anguirus, Armored Killer / Gemrazer (2020)

Literature
 Godzilla at World's End (novel – 1998)
 Godzilla vs. the Robot Monsters (novel – 1999)
 Godzilla: Kingdom of Monsters (comic – 2011–2012)
 Godzilla: Gangsters and Goliaths (comic – 2011)
 Godzilla: Legends (comic – 2011–2012)
 Godzilla: Ongoing (comic – 2012)
 Godzilla: The Half-Century War (comic – 2012–2013)
 Godzilla: Rulers of Earth (comic – 2013–2015)
 Godzilla: Cataclysm (comic – 2014)
 Godzilla in Hell (comic – 2015)
 Godzilla: Oblivion (comic – 2016)
 Godzilla: Monster Apocalypse'' (novel – 2017)

References
Citations

Sources

External links

Toho monsters
Godzilla characters
Film sidekicks
Fictional mutants
Fictional characters with superhuman strength
Science fiction film characters
Fictional characters who can move at superhuman speeds
Fictional monsters
Fantasy film characters
Film characters introduced in 1955
Fictional dinosaurs
Kaiju
Horror film villains